Ras Girtas Power Company (also known as Ras Laffan C power and desalination plant) is a power generation and water desalination plant located in Ras Laffan Industrial City, Qatar.  It has installed capacity of 2,730 MW, which include eight gas turbines and four steam turbines by Mitsubishi Heavy Industries.   The first stone of the plant was officially laid on 4 May 2009.  The plant was commissioned on 31 May 2011 in the presence of the emir, Sheikh Hamad bin Khalifa Al-Thani, and it cost US3.9 billion.  Once fully operational, the plant will produce  of desalinated water.  It uses ten multi-effect distillation/thermal vapour compression units built by Sidem.
 
The plant is operated by Ras Girtas Power Company, and it is owned by Qatar Electricity & Water Company (45%), QatarEnergy (15%), GDF Suez (through International Power, 20%), Mitsui & Co. (10%), Chubu Electric Power (5%), and Shikoku Electric Power Company (5%).

References

Energy infrastructure completed in 2011
Natural gas-fired power stations in Qatar
Integrated water and power plants
Engie
Water in Qatar